Lucas Caires Ferreira (born 29 June 1992) is a Brazilian footballer who plays as a left back.

Career
Born in São Paulo, Caires began his career with CA Diadema, appearing with the club in Campeonato Paulista Segunda Divisão. In July 2014 he moved to União Barbarense, playing regularly in that year's Copa Paulista.

In September 2014 Caires rescinded his link with Barbarense and moved to Portuguesa. He played his first match as a professional on 11 October, replacing Jocinei in the 70th minute of a 1–3 away loss against América-MG for the Série B championship.

In December Caires left the club, after the expiry of his link. He only returned to professional football on 14 December 2016, by joining Goianésia.

References

External links

1992 births
Living people
Footballers from São Paulo
Brazilian footballers
Association football defenders
Campeonato Brasileiro Série B players
União Agrícola Barbarense Futebol Clube players
Associação Portuguesa de Desportos players
Goianésia Esporte Clube players